John Oldham may refer to:

John Oldham (colonist) (1592–1636), early Puritan settler in Massachusetts
John Oldham (poet) (1653–1684), English poet
John Oldham (psychiatrist), American psychiatrist 
John Oldham (engineer) (1779–1840), Irish engineer
John Oldham (architect) (1907–1999), Australian landscape architect
John Oldham (baseball) (born 1932), American former Major League Baseball player
Red Oldham (John Cyrus Oldham, 1893–1961), American baseball pitcher
John Oldham (basketball) (1923–2020), American basketball coach and player
John Oldham (footballer) (born 1949), English footballer